Tokapcup-kamuy (Ainu: , day-illuminating god) is the solar goddess of the Ainu people. Her husband is the moon god Kunnecup-kamuy. Kotan-kar-kamuy was given the task of illuminating the human world, as well raising the culture hero Aynurakkur.

See also
List of solar deities
Amaterasu, her Japanese counterpart

References

Ainu kamuy
Solar goddesses